Gamal Fahnbulleh (born April 1982) is a British broadcast journalist and presenter, currently employed by ITV Granada. He presents Granada Reports, an evening news programme for North West England and the Isle of Man.

Early life
Gamal Fahnbulleh was born on April 1982 in Sierra Leone in West Africa. He, his parents, and his sister Miatta moved to the UK in the 80s when he was three years old.

Education
Fahnbulleh was educated at Taunton School, a boarding independent school in Taunton, Somerset, followed by the University of Manchester, where he graduated with a BA honours in politics and history, followed by a master's degree in international politics. He then enrolled on a postgraduate diploma course in broadcast journalism at City University in London.

Life and career
Fahnbulleh was one of only ten candidates to be selected for the ITV News Bursary Scheme in 2005. He worked for ITN and became a general reporter and programme presenter for Granada Reports on ITV Granada in North West England.

Fahnbulleh joined Sky News in November 2010 as a reporter. He has worked extensively with the British Army and during the summer of 2010 was embedded with the First Battalion, the Duke of Lancaster’s Regiment during a six-month tour of Afghanistan. In November of the same year, he was one of the first reporters to cover the student protests in London, and in 2011 reported live on the August riots from both Manchester and Liverpool. In the same year, he became a freelance presenter for Sky World News between 0:00 and 6:00.

In June 2013 he moved to ITV Breakfast as the North of England Correspondent for Daybreak. In August 2014 he re-joined Sky News as a presenter.

From 2017 onwards, Fahnbulleh was one of Sky News' most common relief presenters, having appeared on every single timeslot operated by the channel including News at Ten, Sunrise, Sky News Tonight and Sky News at 5. Farnbulleh was also the allocated presenter for Friday from 14:00 to 19:00 whilst Sarah Hewson was on maternity leave and also presented The News Hour on Fridays.

In January 2021, Fahnbulleh returned to Granada Reports, becoming the main co-presenter of the programme with Lucy Meacock.

References

External links

1982 births
Alumni of City, University of London
Alumni of the University of Manchester
British reporters and correspondents
British television newsreaders and news presenters
Black British television personalities
English people of Ethiopian descent
Living people
People educated at Taunton School
ITV Breakfast presenters and reporters
ITV regional newsreaders and journalists
ITN newsreaders and journalists
Sky News newsreaders and journalists